Harangul is a village in Parbhani district, Maharashtra, India.

Geography
It is located at an average elevation 438 m above MSL.

External links
 Satellite map of Harangul

References 

Parbhani
Villages in Parbhani district